Harold William Wescott (1872 – 1923) was a British philatelist who was appointed to the Roll of Distinguished Philatelists in 1921.

References

British philatelists
1872 births
1923 deaths
Signatories to the Roll of Distinguished Philatelists